Gilroy Gardens Family Theme Park, often shortened to Gilroy Gardens, is a horticulture-themed amusement park located in Gilroy, California, United States. Designed and built by Michael Bonfante, the park originally opened as Bonfante Gardens in 2001. The  is owned by the city of Gilroy and operated by Gilroy Gardens, Inc. a 501(c)(3) nonprofit organization; it features over 40 rides and attractions and is known for its Circus Trees, created by Axel Erlandson.

History 

The park was founded by Michael and Claudia Bonfante after selling their Nob Hill Foods supermarket chain to build the tree park. The park was constructed gradually over a period of 25 years. Before it became an amusement park open to the public, it was known as Tree Haven, and was a commercial plant nursery, as well as a recreational facility for employees of Nob Hill Foods. The park opened to the public in June 2001 as Bonfante Gardens. The name was changed to Gilroy Gardens in February 2007.  The park features 19 rides, 27 attractions and six gardens. The most well known garden features 24 Circus Trees that were grown and shaped with multiple trunks, basket-weave patterns, and hearts by the late Axel Erlandson.

Starting in 2004, the park began its annual holiday celebration, Gilroy Gardens Holiday Lights.

The park struggled with financial difficulty and low attendance during the first two years of operation. It closed early for its first two seasons and the park's management debated whether to open the park at all for the third season. Paramount Parks began to manage the park on contract starting with the 2003 season.

Cedar Fair acquired Paramount Parks from CBS Corporation in June 2006 and continued the management contract to operate Gilroy Gardens. On December 31, 2021, the contract to manage the park expired after both parties decided not to renew the contract. Gilroy Gardens Inc., the nonprofit that owns the park, began operating the park on its own for the 2022 season.

The city of Gilroy purchased the park on March 5, 2008.

Mid-March 2020 saw the park get shut down on grounds of COVID-19 pandemic. It reopened mid-to-late May 2021, restricted to California residents and adhering to strict measures like social distancing and wearing masks.

Attractions

Roller Coasters

Family Rides

Thrill Rides

Other Attractions:
Bonfante Falls (formerly Pinnacles Waterfall)Bridge behind an artificial waterfall.
Bonfante's Splash GardenWater play area.
 Oak Park PlaygroundChildren's play area.
 Water OasisWater play area aimed at smaller children (introduced in 2014 replacing Pinnacles Rock Maze.)

Former Attractions:

 Pinnacles Rock MazeArtificial maze resembling caves found at Pinnacles National Park.

See also 

 Tree Shaping: Creating with living trees structures and art

References

External links 

 
 

2001 establishments in California
Amusement parks in California
Buildings and structures in Santa Clara County, California
Cedar Fair amusement parks
Gilroy, California
Parks in Santa Clara County, California
San Francisco Bay Area amusement parks
Tourist attractions in Santa Clara County, California
Amusement parks opened in 2001